Clifford "Cliff" Lambert (birth registered first ¼ 1930), also known by the nickname of "Slam", is an English former professional rugby league footballer who played in the 1940s, 1950s and 1960s.

Background
Cliff 'Slam' Lambert's birth was registered in Pontefract district, West Riding of Yorkshire, England, he has lived at Robbins Terrace, Featherstone.

Playing career

Challenge Cup Final appearances
Cliff Lambert played  in Featherstone Rovers' 12-18 defeat by Workington Town in the 1951–52 Challenge Cup Final during the 1951–52 season at Wembley Stadium, London on Saturday 19 April 1952, in front of a crowd of 72,093.

County Cup Final appearances
Cliff Lambert played right-, i.e. number 12, and scored a try in Featherstone Rovers' 15-14 victory over Hull F.C. in the 1959–60 Yorkshire County Cup Final during the 1959–60 season at Headingley Rugby Stadium, Leeds on Saturday 31 October 1959, and played right- in Hunslet's 12-2 victory over Hull Kingston Rovers in the 1962–63 Yorkshire County Cup Final during the 1962–63 season at Headingley Rugby Stadium, Leeds on Saturday 27 October 1962.

Club career
Cliff Lambert made his début for Featherstone Rovers on Tuesday 20 September 1949, he appears to have scored no drop-goals (or field-goals as they are currently known in Australasia), but prior to the 1974–75 season all goals, whether; conversions, penalties, or drop-goals, scored 2-points, consequently prior to this date drop-goals were often not explicitly documented, therefore '0' drop-goals may indicate drop-goals not recorded, rather than no drop-goals scored. In addition, prior to the 1949–50 season, the archaic field-goal was also still a valid means of scoring points.

Testimonial match
Cliff Lambert's benefit season/testimonial match at Featherstone Rovers took place during the 1959–60 season.

Honoured at Featherstone Rovers
Cliff Lambert is a Featherstone Rovers Hall of Fame inductee.

Genealogical information
Cliff Lambert's marriage to Betty D. (née Normington (also known incorrectly as Normanton)) (birth registered during fourth ¼  in Hemsworth district) was registered during third ¼ 1951 in Pontefract district. They had children; the future rugby union footballer for Headingley FC and Harlequin F.C.; Colin W. Lambert (birth registered during second ¼  in Wakefield district), Michael Lambert (birth registered during third ¼  in Pontefract district), John Lambert (birth registered during third ¼  in Pontefract district), and Amanda J. Lambert (birth registered during third ¼  in Pontefract district).

References

External links

Search for "Lambert" at rugbyleagueproject.org
Laurie Gant 1966 to 1970
Terry Ramshaw. 1943 to 2017. Rest in Peace
The Ones That Got Away
Willis Fawley

1930 births
Living people
English rugby league players
Featherstone Rovers players
Hunslet F.C. (1883) players
Rugby league locks
Rugby league players from Pontefract
Rugby league second-rows